The 2004 All-Ireland Senior Club Camogie Championship for the leading clubs in the women's team field sport of camogie was won by St Lachtain’s, Freshford (Kilkenny), who defeated Granagh-Ballingarry from Limerick in the final, played at Parnell Park.

Arrangements
The championship was organised on the traditional provincial system used in Gaelic Games since the 1880s, with Davitts and O'Donovan Rossa winning the championships of the other two provinces.

The Final
A close-range goal from Imelda Kennedy gave St Lachtain’s a half-time lead of 1–3 to 0–4 in the final, further points from Kennedy widened the gap and Marie O'Connor palmed the ball for the decisive goal.

Final stages

References

External links
 Camogie Association

2004 in camogie
2004